The Treasure of Gesine Jacobsen (German: Der Schatz der Gesine Jakobsen) is a 1923 German silent drama film directed by Rudolf Walther-Fein and starring Marija Leiko, Paul Wegener and Reinhold Schünzel. It premiered in Berlin on 13 February 1923.

Cast

References

Bibliography
 Grange, William. Cultural Chronicle of the Weimar Republic. Scarecrow Press, 2008.

External links

1923 films
Films of the Weimar Republic
German silent feature films
German drama films
Films directed by Rudolf Walther-Fein
1923 drama films
German black-and-white films
Silent drama films
1920s German films
1920s German-language films